Portion Boys are a Finnish dance-pop band formed in 2010 in Helsinki.

History 
The members of Portion Boys are originally from Isojoki and Tampere. The group started releasing music on YouTube in 2010, and as of 2014 their singles are digitally distributed by Sony Music Finland. They first entered the Finnish singles chart in 2016 with their single "". As of 2022, the group has reached the top ten of the national chart on five other occasions, achieving a first place in the summer of 2021 with their song, "", a certified double platinum.

Their entry "" was released on 19 January 2023. In the final, they finished in second place with a total of 152 points (124 from the televote and 28 points from the juries).

Members

Current members 
 Aapo "A.P." Vuori – lead vocals (2021–present)
 Raimo "Kenraali Vahva" Paavola – rap (2010–present)
 Mikael "El Meissel" Forsby – keyboards (2010–present)
 Roope "Taiteilija" Nieminen – drums (2010–present)
 Tiina "JaloTiina" Forsby – dance (2010–present)

Past members 
 Jyrki Paavola – lead vocals (2010–2020)

Discography

Extended plays 
  (2021)

Singles

References

External links 
 

 
2010 establishments in Finland
Finnish musical groups
Finnish pop music groups
Musical groups established in 2010
Musical groups from Helsinki